Walcote is a village in the English county of Leicestershire.

It is on the A4304 road some two miles east of the town of Lutterworth and a mile east of Junction 20 of the M1 motorway. It is the major settlement of the civil parish of Misterton with Walcote and forms part of Harborough district.

External links

Some description - several photographs
Misterton with Walcote Community Trust

Villages in Leicestershire
Harborough District